PELbO (initiated 2006 in Trondheim) is a Norwegian electronica/jazz trio.

Biography 
The band's debut albumet PELbO (2010), was nominated for the 2010 Open class Spellemannprisen.

The trio was named NTNU-ambassadør in 2011, a title that is awarded a jazz artist or ensemble annually, for in an outstanding manner to serve as ambassador for NTNU and the jazz scene in Trondheim.

Band members 
 Ine Hoem - vocals, electronics
 Kristoffer Lo - tuba, electronics, vocals
 Trond Bersu - drums

References

External links 

Norwegian electronic music groups
Norwegian post-rock groups
Norwegian jazz ensembles
Norwegian experimental musical groups
Musical groups established in 2006
Musical groups from Trondheim